
Gmina Kołczygłowy is a rural gmina (administrative district) in Bytów County, Pomeranian Voivodeship, in northern Poland.

The gmina contains part of the protected area called Słupia Valley Landscape Park.

Villages
Gmina Kołczygłowy contains the villages and settlements of Barkocin, Barnowiec, Barnowo, Barnowski Młyn, Darżkowo, Dobojewo, Gałąźnia Mała, Gałąźnia Wielka, Gęślice, Górki, Grępno, Jasionka, Jezierze, Klęskowo, Kołczygłówki, Kołczygłowy, Laski, Łobzowo, Łubno, Miłobądź, Nowa Jasionka, Nowe Łubno, Podgórze, Przyborze, Pustka, Radusz, Różki, Sierowo, Świelubie, Wądół, Wierszynko, Wierszyno, Witanowo, Zagony and Zatoki.

Neighbouring gminas
Gmina Kołczygłowy is bordered by the gminas of Borzytuchom, Dębnica Kaszubska, Miastko, Trzebielino and Tuchomie.

References
 Polish official population figures 2006

Kolczyglowy
Bytów County